LTRA may refer to:

 Land Tenure Reform Association
 Leukotriene receptor antagonist
 Long term response action
 LtrA, open reading frame